The Emgrand GE, formerly known as the Geely GE, is a three-seat full-size luxury concept car that was first unveiled at the Shanghai Motor Show in 2009. GE originally appeared similar to the Rolls-Royce Phantom before being restyled in 2010 and rebadged as an Emgrand, Geely's luxury brand. Price was to be ranged between 31,000 and US$47,000 and was scheduled to be available to the Chinese market in 2014.

References 

GE
Full-size vehicles
Limousines
Sedans